Makrochori F.C. is a Greek football club, based in Makrochori, Imathia.

The club was founded in 1950. They will play in Football League 2 for the season 2013-14.

History 

On March 30, 1950, Doxa is officially recognized by the Court of Veria and Spring 1954 registration by the EPO with serial number 350. A number that carries so far and the Makrichori F.C., which is the follow-up.
Since then and for 58 years Makrochori gives consistently present in all the official football competitions.

1999 and after an eventful match for the championship of the A class, between Doxa and Makrochori Academy, founded by supporters of Doxa to become its subsidiary decided by the presidents of the three groups of Makrochori that at that time competed in the same category (A, current A1), Makis Tsiranidis of Doxa, Sakis Voulgaris of  Ethnikos and George Soumpekas of  Academy, merging the three groups. The result is  the Union Apostle Paul, which is a continuation of Doxa.

In 2013 the team changed name to Makrochori F.C. and it will compete with this to the Football League 2 for 2nd time for the season 2014-15.

External links 
 https://web.archive.org/web/20131002124044/http://makrochorifc.gr/

Football clubs in Central Macedonia